The Royal Cambodian Air Force FC is a professional football club in Cambodia. It played in the C-League in the 2000s, the top division of Cambodian football for several seasons before it was relegated. The club is a branch of the Royal Cambodian Air Force, which in turn is a part of the Royal Cambodian Armed Forces.

References

Football clubs in Cambodia
Sport in Phnom Penh
Military association football clubs